Dinosuchus is a problematic genus of extinct alligatorid crocodilian. It was very large compared to other alligatorids, save for the giant caiman Purussaurus and its closest relatives. The genus was first described in 1876 on the basis of a vertebra from the Brazilian Amazon, the type species being named D. terror. In 1921, a new species of Dinosuchus, D. neivensis, was named based on a large mandible that was discovered in Colombia. D. neivensis was later found to be synonymous with both Brachygnathosuchus braziliensis and Purussaurus brasiliensis, being reassigned in 1924 to the senior synonym P. brasiliensis. In 1965, D. terror was proposed to be a nomen vanum.

The name Dinosuchus means "terrible crocodile" in Greek. It is not to be confused with Deinosuchus, a large alligatoroid from Late Cretaceous North America.

References

Alligatoridae
Miocene crocodylomorphs
Miocene reptiles of South America
Pliocene crocodylomorphs
Pliocene reptiles of South America
Uquian
Chapadmalalan
Montehermosan
Pliocene Brazil
Fossils of Brazil
Fossil taxa described in 1876
Prehistoric pseudosuchian genera